Goniodorididae are a taxonomic family of sea slugs, specifically dorid nudibranchs, marine gastropod molluscs in the order Opisthobranchia.

Genera
Genera in the family Goniodorididae include:
 Ancula Lovén, 1846
 Goniodoris Forbes & Goodsir, 1939
 Goniodoridella Pruvot-Fol, 1933
 Lophodoris G. O. Sars, 1878
 Murphydoris Sigurdsson, 1991
 Okenia Menke, 1830 - synonyms: Idalia Leuckart, 1828; Idaliella Bergh, 1881; Idalina Norman, 1890; Cargoa Vogel & Schultz, 1970; Ceratodoris Gray, 1850; Hopkinsia MacFarland, 1905; Sakishimaia Hamatani, 2001; Teshia Edmunds, 1966
 Trapania Pruvot-Fol, 1931

References

Further reading 
 Thompson, T. E., &  Brown, G.H., 1984. Biology of opisthobranch Molluscs. Vol. 2. Ray Society; London. 1-229, p.39